Buldecovirus is a subgenus of viruses in the genus Deltacoronavirus.

References

Virus subgenera
Deltacoronaviruses